Canadian singer and songwriter Avril Lavigne has received various awards and nominations throughout her career. She is the recipient of seven ASCAP Awards, an Echo Music Prize, a Guinness World Records, ten Juno Awards, eight MuchMusic Video Awards, two NRJ Music Awards, three Teen Choice Awards, six World Music Awards and twenty-one MTV Awards around the world. She has also been nominated for eight Grammy Awards, three American Music Awards, three Brit Awards and four Billboard Music Awards.

Lavigne's debut studio album. Let Go (2002), was certified seven-times Platinum by the Recording Industry Association of America and sold over 16 million copies worldwide. The album won Album of the Year at Juno Awards of 2003, while at the 45th Annual Grammy Awards it was nominated for Best Pop Vocal Album. It spawned two Billboard Hot 100 top-five singles, "Complicated" and "I'm with You" were both nominated for Song of the Year and Best Female Pop Vocal Performance at the Grammy Awards in 2003 and 2004, respectively. The former won an International Achievement Award at the SOCAN Awards in Toronto. She won awards for Best New Artist at several award ceremonies in 2002 and 2003, including MTV Video Music Award for Best New Artist, Juno Award for New Artist of the Year and the Echo Award for Most Successful International Newcomer of the Year.

Lavigne's second album, Under My Skin (2004) It debuted at number one on the Billboard 200 and earned the singer five nominations at the Juno Awards of 2005, winning three of them; Artist of the Year, Juno Fan Choice Award and Pop Album of the Year.  Her third album The Best Damn Thing (2007) produced her most successful single to date, "Girlfriend", which peaked at number one on the Billboard Hot 100. Its music video became the first on YouTube to reach 100 million views and became the most watched video of all time on the site in 2008. The single received several awards, including Most Addictive Track at the 2007 MTV Europe Music Awards, Song of the Year at Los Premios MTV Latinoamérica 2007, Choice Music: Single at 2007 Teen Choice Awards, the Nickelodeon Kids' Choice Award for Favorite Song and was nominated for Single of the Year at the Juno Awards of 2008. In addition, Lavigne won International Female Artist of the Year at the 2008 NRJ Music Awards. She also won two consecutive People's Choice Favourite Canadian Artist at the 2007 and 2008 MuchMusic Video Awards.

In January 2010, recorded the song, "Alice" for the Tim Burton's feature film Alice in Wonderland. The song received a nomination for Best Original Song at the Satellite Awards 2010 and won Best Video From a Film at the 2011 MTV Video Music Awards Japan. In the next year, Lavigne released her fourth studio album, Goodbye Lullaby, which peaked at number one in Australia and became her fourth album to reach the top five on the Billboard 200. The album was nominated for Album of the Year and Pop Album of the Year at the Juno Awards of 2012. The first single from the album, "What The Hell", was successful, reaching number one in Japan, the top five in Asia and  the Top 10 in Europe. The song won the Billboard Japan Music Award for Hot 100 Airplay of the Year.  Her fifth album Avril Lavigne (2013), won the RTHK International Pop Poll Award for The Best Selling English Album, also received a nomination at the 2014 World Music Awards for World's Best Album. The lead single from the album "Here's to Never Growing Up" won International Video of the Year By A Canadian at the 2013 MuchMusic Video Awards.

Awards and nominations

Other Accolades

Guinness World Records

State honours

Listicles

Notes

References

Awards
Lavigne, Avril